The biography of The Cheetah Girls, an American girl group, consists of two studio albums, fifteen singles and three soundtrack albums. They released their first soundtrack album, The Cheetah Girls on August 12, 2003, the album reached #33 on the US Billboard 200 and certified double platinum by the RIAA for shipments of over 2,000,000 copies. Following the release of the film and soundtrack, the girls decided to form a group of the same name,.

On October 11, 2005, the group released their Christmas album, Cheetah-licious Christmas. However, original member Raven-Symoné decided not to join the group, in order to pursuit promotion of her solo career. After the girls' second movie premiere in 2006, they released another soundtrack album, The Cheetah Girls 2. The band released their second album, TCG in September 2007 after signing a deal with Hollywood Records and it charted at #44 in the US. Their third and final soundtrack album, The Cheetah Girls: One World was released in August 2008.

Albums

Studio albums

Live albums

Soundtracks

Extended plays

Singles

Promotional singles

Notes
: "Fuego" did not enter the US Billboard Hot 100, but it peaked at #22 on the Bubbling Under Hot 100 Singles, which serves as a 25-song extension to the Billboard Hot 100.

Music videos

Other album appearances

References

External links
The Cheetah Girls official website

Discography
Cheetah Girls, The